Phyllonorycter fragilella is a moth of the family Gracillariidae. It is known from Québec in Canada and Texas, Maine, Michigan, New York, Massachusetts, Illinois and Wyoming in the United States.

The wingspan is 8.5–9 mm.

The larvae feed on Lonicera species (including Lonicera sempervirens and Lonicera × bella), Symphoricarpos species (including Symphoricarpos orbiculatus and Symphoricarpos vulgaris) and Chiococca alba. They mine the leaves of their host plant. The mine has the form of a tentiform mine on the underside of the leaf.

References

fragilella
Moths of North America
Moths described in 1878